Blue people may refer to:
 Methemoglobinemia, a disorder that can turn skin blue
 the Blue Fugates, an Appalachian family with congenital methemoglobinemia
 Cyanosis, a general medical condition that can turn skin blue
 Blue baby syndrome, cyanosis in babies
 A name for the  Tuareg people, from their traditional clothing
 A term in the United States to refer members of the Democratic Party (United States)
 People with argyria, a condition that turns the skin blue
 the Blue Man Group, a performing group that performs in blue makeup

Religion 
 Hindu deities such as Vishnu and Krishna are often depicted as having blue skin

In fiction
 The Smurfs, small blue humanoid creatures from the cartoon and comic series of the same name 
 The Na'vi, a fictional species that live on the planet Pandora in the 2009 film Avatar
 Doctor Manhattan, a character from the comic book series Watchmen and related media

See also
Blue skin (disambiguation)